Frederic Michael Tarnok (born November 24, 1998) is an American professional baseball pitcher for the Oakland Athletics of Major League Baseball (MLB). He made his MLB debut with the Atlanta Braves in 2022.

Amateur career
Tarnok attended Riverview High School in Riverview, Florida, where he played baseball. In 2017, his senior year, he went 7–0 with a 0.66 ERA while also batting .393. Following his senior season, he was selected by the Atlanta Braves in the third round of the 2017 Major League Baseball draft. He signed with the Braves, forgoing his commitment to play college baseball at the University of Tampa.

Professional career

Atlanta Braves
Tarnok made his professional debut with the Rookie-level Gulf Coast League Braves, going 0–3 with a 2.57 ERA over 14 innings. In 2018, he pitched with the Rome Braves of the Class A South Atlantic League, with whom he was named an All-Star. Over 27 games (11 starts), Tarnok went 5–5 with a 3.96 ERA, striking out 83 batters over  innings. Tarnok missed time during the 2019 season due to injury, but still started 19 games for the Florida Fire Frogs of the Class A-Advanced Florida State League, pitching to a 3–7 record with a 4.87 ERA. He did not play a minor league game in 2020 due to the cancellation of the minor league season caused by the COVID-19 pandemic. Tarnok missed the beginning of the 2021 season while rehabbing and made his first appearance in mid-June for Rome, now members of the High-A East. After  innings pitched with Rome, he was promoted to the Mississippi Braves of the Double-A South in mid-July with whom he finished the year. Over 16 games (14 starts) between the two teams, Tarnok went 6–4 with a 3.44 ERA and 109 strikeouts over  innings.

On November 18, 2021, the Braves selected Tarnok's contract and added him to the 40-man roster. He returned to Mississippi to begin the 2022 season. In early July, he was promoted to the Gwinnett Stripers of the Triple-A International League. On August 16, 2022, Tarnok was called up to the majors. He made his MLB debut on August 17 from the bullpen. He pitched two-thirds of an inning with no hits or walks and his first career  strikeout against Tyler Naquin.

Oakland Athletics
On December 12, 2022, the Oakland Athletics acquired Tarnok from the Braves in a three-team trade in which the Atlanta Braves acquired Sean Murphy, the Milwaukee Brewers acquired William Contreras, Joel Payamps, and Justin Yeager, and the Athletics also acquired Manny Piña, Kyle Muller, Esteury Ruiz, and Royber Salinas.

Personal life
Tarnok's parents are Jeff and Neung. He has a brother, Christopher, and a half-brother, Nick. Through his mother, Tarnok is of Thai descent.

References

External links

1998 births
Living people
Atlanta Braves players
Baseball players from Florida
Florida Fire Frogs players
Gulf Coast Braves players
Gwinnett Stripers players
Major League Baseball pitchers
Mississippi Braves players
People from Brandon, Florida
Rome Braves players
American sportspeople of Thai descent